Halmstad Arena is a multi purpose area in Halmstad, Sweden. Halmstad Arena is used for sport activities, concerts, meetings and fairs.

Construction began on 15 November 2007 and the arena was officially opened on 20 February 2010.

Halmstad Arena

The main arena building
The main building at Halmstad Arena includes four full size sport halls, five smaller special halls, two full size ice rinks and one smaller rink and a waterpark/indoor swimming pool.

Other facilities
The area also includes a skatepark, twelve full size soccer fields, two full size soccer fields with artificial playing surface, five smaller soccer fields and an outdoor facility for track & field and soccer practice.

Tenants

 Halmstad BTK
 Halmstad Hammers Hockey
 Sannarps Hockey Club
 Halmstads Konståkningsklubb
 Simklubben Laxen
 Simföreningen Aquariet
 HK Drott
 Halmstads Handbollspojkar
 Halmstads Fäktsällskap
 HAIS
 Brottarklubben Allians
 Halmstads Rytmiska GF
 Halmstad Bordtennisklubb
 Halmstad Innebandyklubb
 GF Nissaflickorna
 Shotokan
 Halmstads Bordtennisallians
 Halmstad Basket

See also
 List of indoor arenas in Sweden
 List of indoor arenas in Nordic countries

References

External links

 

Indoor arenas in Sweden
Handball venues in Sweden
Sport in Halmstad
Buildings and structures in Halland County
2010 establishments in Sweden
Sports venues completed in 2010